Rossiya Tournament 1976 was played in Khabarovsk on 22–25 January 1976. It was the third time the Rossiya Tournament was arranged. The Soviet Union won the tournament.

The tournament was decided by round-robin results like a group stage.

Results

Sources 
 Norges herrlandskamper i bandy 
 Sverige-Sovjet i bandy 
 Rossija Tournament 

1976 in Soviet sport
1976 in bandy
1976